Ben's Mill is a 1982 American documentary film directed by Michel Chalufour and John Karol. The film, set in Barnet, Vermont, details the workings of the Thresher Mill on the Stevens River, including how energy from the river is used to drive a multitude of leather belts and various machines. The film focuses on the steps one man, Ben, uses to make one of his white pine watering tanks, and then a horse-drawn sled for different members of the Barnet community. It was nominated for an Academy Award for Best Documentary Feature. The film was produced as an episode of the PBS series Odyssey.

Reaction
Writing in American Anthropologist, George L. Hicks stated that "Ben's Mill exercises tight control on its nostalgia, while using specific detail to demonstrate its point."

References

External links

Watch part of Ben's Mill on Folkstreams
Ben's Mill at Documentary Educational Resources

1982 television films
1982 films
1980s English-language films
American documentary television films
Hydropower
1982 documentary films
Documentary films about technology
Barnet, Vermont
Films set in Vermont
1980s American films